Linfengying railway station is a railway station located in Lioujia District, Tainan, Taiwan. It is located on the West Coast line and is operated by Taiwan Railways.

References

1901 establishments in Taiwan
Railway stations opened in 1901
Railway stations in Tainan
Railway stations served by Taiwan Railways Administration